Suwara Ilkhanizada (‎; 1937–1976) was a Kurdish poet and writer. He was born in the village of Turjan near Saqqez in the north-west of Iran. He went to local school and continued his studies in Tabriz.

In 1962, he enrolled in the judicial law department of faculty of law at the University of Tehran. In 1964, he was imprisoned for six months in Qezelqaleh prison in Tehran for his alleged ties to the Kurdistan Democratic Party of Iran. He graduated in 1968 and began working at the Kurdish service of Radio Tehran, where he presented a popular literary program called Tapo û Bomelêl. He died on January 14, 1976, after a car accident and a failed surgery operation at the Misaghiyye hospital in Tehran. He is buried at Hamamian cemetery a village near Bukan.

Books
 Xewe Berdîne (Collection of Poems), Ashti Publishers, 1992.
 Tapo û Bomelêl, Ashti Publishers, 2000.

Poems
 Xewe Berdîne (Stone Dream), poem
 Dûyi Rêbendan (February 13), Rûnakî Journal, No. 290, p. 19, Oct. 1969.
 To Deryamî (You are my sea), poem
 Korpey Lêwbebar (The sick child), poem
 Şar (City)
 Xêllî Diro (Tribe of Liars)
 Kiçî Beyan (Daughter of Morning)
 Sirwey Beyanî (Breeze of Morning)
 Bo Kiçe Kurdê (For a Kurdish girl)
 Halow'' (Eagle)

External links
 Suwara Ilkhanizada, Kurdish Language School, Mydigheten För Skolutveckling, Sweden (in Kurdish).
 Suwara Ilkhanizada, A short Biography (in Kurdish). 
 Suwara and Kurdish Prose, Muhammad Bahrawar, 2006.

Kurdish poets
1937 births
1976 deaths
Democratic Party of Iranian Kurdistan politicians
Kurdish-language writers
Kurdish people
University of Tehran alumni
Kurdish scholars
20th-century poets
Iranian Kurdish people
20th-century Iranian people
People from Saghez